Virgibacillus indicus is a Gram-variable, endospore-forming, moderately halophilic and motile bacterium from the genus of Virgibacillus which has been isolated from sediments from the Indian Ocean.

References

Bacillaceae
Bacteria described in 2018